The Stinking Rose is a California-based restaurant known for including garlic in all its dishes, including its garlic ice cream. It has two outlets, one in San Francisco and one in Beverly Hills.

The restaurant's official mantra is "We season our garlic with food". It has inspired two garlic-themed cookbooks from Ten Speed Press, titled The Stinking Cookbook (1994) and The Stinking Rose Restaurant Cookbook (2006).

In February 2014, the 38,500-square-foot (3,577 m2) site housing the Beverly Hills restaurant was put up for sale. It sold in September of that year for about $17 million, though the restaurant continued to operate pending redevelopment plans. It announced its closure in October 2021, with no reopening date known.

References

External links
 

1991 establishments in California
Cuisine of the Western United States
Garlic
Italian restaurants in the United States
North Beach, San Francisco
Restaurants established in 1991
Restaurants in California
Restaurants in Los Angeles
Restaurants in San Francisco